{{Automatic Taxobox
| fossil_range = Recent
| image = Prosciurillus leucomus - Tangkoko (3).JPG
| image_caption = Whitish dwarf squirrel (Prosciurillus leucomus)
| taxon = Prosciurillus
| authority = Ellerman, 1947
| type_species = Sciurus murinus'
| subdivision_ranks = Species
| subdivision =Prosciurillus abstrususProsciurillus leucomusProsciurillus murinusProsciurillus rosenbergiiProsciurillus weberi}}Prosciurillus is a genus of rodent in the family Sciuridae, endemic to Sulawesi and nearby small islands, Indonesia. 
It contains the following species:
 Secretive dwarf squirrel (Prosciurillus abstrusus)
 Alston’s Sulawesi dwarf squirrel (Prosciurillus alstoni)
 Whitish dwarf squirrel (Prosciurillus leucomus)
 Celebes dwarf squirrel (Prosciurillus murinus)
 Sanghir squirrel (Prosciurillus rosenbergii)
 Roux’s Sulawesi dwarf squirrel (Prosciurillus topapuensis)
 Weber's dwarf squirrel (Prosciurillus weberi'')

References

 
Rodents of Sulawesi
Rodent genera
Taxonomy articles created by Polbot